Ram Chandra (Lalaji) (2 February 1873 – 14 August 1931) was a spiritual guide from Fatehgarh Uttar Pradesh India. He was popularly known as "Lalaji" among his followers. He is said to have re-discovered the ancient Indian system of transmission called "Pranahuti" (offering of Prana) which is often referred to as “Pranasya Prana” (Life of Life) in the practice of meditation. After his passing, his disciples started many spiritual organizations like Shri Ram Chandra Mission and Ramashram Satsang. Also by his disciple Har Narayan Saxena https://harnarayan-saxena.com/

Early life, Education and Family
He was born on February 2, 1873, at Fatehgarh, Uttar Pradesh in North India on the day of "Basant Panchmi" (as per Hindu calendar). His father, Harbaksh Rai, was a tax superintendent at Farrukhabad. His mother, Mrs. Durga Devi, was a religious lady, who influenced Ram Chandra towards spirituality in his childhood. His father belonged to a family of Jagirdars (landlords), but they lost most of their wealth in the post mutiny disturbances at that time, and in a legal battle. Later Ram Chandra worked with one of his father’s associates in the collector's office at Fatehgarh for his livelihood. He was married and led a normal family life. He knew Urdu, Persian, Arabic, Hindi, Sanskrit and English languages. He completed his education from a Mission School at Farrukhabad.

Spiritual Life
His interest in spirituality grew during his school days. The teenager Ram Chandra was married to a noble lady of a respectable family. His father expired sometime after his marriage. There was sufficient property left, but he could not live like a rich man as God had willed that he should become a 'Saint' and show the real path to suffering humanity. He had to abandon his home for a much smaller house. While he was facing many such tragic occurrences like a stalwart, he came into the contact of a Sufi Master, Hazrat Maulana Fazl Ahmad Khan Sahib R.A. living in a nearby campus named 'Madarsa Mufti Sahib'. Ram Chandra got initiated [Bay't] on 23rd January 1896 [at 05.00 PM] and got completed (Taqmil), declared full-fledged Spiritual Master and the 36th 'Shaykh' into the Hierarchy of Golden Sufi Saints on 11th October 1896 [AD] by the aforesaid Sufi Master, without  conversion into Islam.

Ram Chandra (Lalaji) of Fatehgarh UP did not declare anybody as his successor during his lifetime, except a special mention regarding his son, Jagmohan Narain, [in the ‘Vasihatnaama’ i.e. his last ‘will’ signed by him at Fatehgarh on 23rd October 1930 AD. After his death and during the lifetime of his son, Jagmohan Narain [1901–1944] there was no confusion in accepting him as his de jure heir. But after the death of the latter, his namesake and one of his adherent disciples, Mahatma Ram Chandra, widely known as Babuji of Shahjahanpur UP declared himself as his successor, initiating from the mention of dictation by Jagmohan Narain [died on 31st August 1944] in a vision after his death, given on Wednesday dated 06th September 1944 in its chapter <laalaajinilayam - Writer of Sahaj Marg script>. And thereafter, the aforesaid “Babuji” of Shahjahanpur UP incorporated many changes into the original system of Naqshbandi Sufis, said to have with the due permission of his Master, ‘Lalaji’ of Fatehgarh UP, and finally, the system is now known as “Heartfulness” headquartered at ‘Kanha Shanti Vanam’, near Hyderabad India, headed by Shri Kamlesh D Bhai Patel, widely known as “Daaji”.

Lalaji rediscovered the ancient  technique of yogic transmission which is also called  “Pranahuti” (Upanishadic “Pranasya Pran”). Pranahuti involves transmitting divine energy from the original source into the heart of the practitioner to expedite his spiritual progress. When he began imparting spiritual training some school teachers experienced positive changes in their personalities. The word spread and more people were attracted to Ram Chandra. He started formal group meditation (Satsang) in 1914. He continued the work until his death on 14th August 1931. His spiritual teachings are said to have equally influenced people of all casts and religions in India. It was believed by his followers that through his simplified and effective training he made it possible for humans to attain their spiritual perfection during their lifetime itself while they lead a normal householder’s life.

Teachings
Some of his teachings are:

Purpose of the human life is to realize god and one should attain this purpose in his or her life without fail. 
 

 Have company of realized people if you want to become realized.

 Do not offer advice to anyone unless asked for.

 Ritual ceremonies should be avoided.

 Widow marriage and female education should be promoted.

 Wants should be reduced. People should earn money honestly and spend it on others after meeting their basic needs.

 Any type of intoxication is bad. 

 A person should be the same inside and outside, that is, he should speak what he has in his heart.

 Transforming a human being into a better human being is the best miracle. 

 Home is the best training ground for spirituality and the greatest form of penance for submission, endurance, and sacrifice. 

 Some amount of afflictions is divine blessing, holding many secrets. Some amount of worries and insults is useful for spiritual progress.

 Good conversation skills are effective means for bringing harmony in human relationships.

 Be good to your enemies.

Following
His disciples started many spiritual organizations like: “SRCM (Shri Ram Chandra Mission)” started by his disciple with the same name as his – “Ram Chandra” of Shahjahanpur ,“Ramashram Satsang” by “Chaturbhuj Sahay”, “ABSS (Akhil Bhartiya Santmat Satsang)” by “Yashpal” and “Ram Samadhi Ashram”  by “Thakur Ram Singh Bhati”. Har Narayan Saxena https://harnarayan-saxena.com/

Literary Work
He is said to have produced a vast amount of manuscript literature but most of it was lost after his death in 1931. From the remaining manuscript which was in Urdu language some was initially serially published in the “SahajMarg” Journal of Shri Ram Chandra mission from the year 1958 onwards in Hindi language. Its English translation by S. A.Sarnad was published in the form of a book “Truth Eternal” in 1973. Some of his other writings are published by the “Heartfulness Institute” in the books: Complete Works of Ram Chandra, Vol. 2, Vol. 3 and Vol. 4. https://harnarayan-saxena.com/books%2C-video-and-audio

150th Anniversay of Shri Ram Chandraji Maharaj of Fatehgarh 
150th Anniversary of the Adi Guru of Sahajmarg, popluarly known as The Heartfulness Way, Revered Lalaji, is scheduled to be celebrated for over a week starting from Jan 25th. Celebrations will take place in the World’s largest Meditation Hall in Kanha Shanti Vanam. Over 1,00,000 practitioners from different parts of the world are expected to participate with millions of practitioners joining online. On this auspicious occasion, the first of its kind Inner Peace Museum will be unveiled at Kanha Shanti Vanam by revered Daaji. Internationally renowned artists, Rahul Sharma, Pandit Hariprasad Chaurasia, Ustad Amjad Ali Khan, Ustad Rashid Khan, Sudha Raghunathan, Shashank Subramanyam, Kaushiki Chakraborty, Sanjeev Abhyankar will perform live music as part of this unique festival of Indian Spiritual Heritage.

References 

16. https://harnarayan-saxena.com/books%2C-video-and-audio
1931 deaths
1873 births
Indian spiritual teachers
Indian spiritual writers
Indian yoga gurus
Meditation